Ong Teng Cheong  (22 January 1936 – 8 February 2002) was a Singaporean architect, union leader and politician who served as the fifth president of Singapore between 1993 and 1999. He was the first president in Singapore's history to be directly elected by popular vote. 

A former member of the governing People's Action Party (PAP) and Ong served as Chairman of the People's Action Party between 1981 and 1993, after Toh Chin Chye stepped down from the position. He was the Member of Parliament (MP) for Kim Keat SMC between 1972 and 1991, and Toa Payoh GRC between 1991 and 1993. He also served as Minister for Information, Communications and the Arts between 1978 and 1981, Minister for Manpower between 1981 and 1983, and Deputy Prime Minister between 1985 and 1993.

Ong resigned from the PAP and his political positions before contesting in the 1993 presidential election as an independent candidate and won. He was sworn on 1 September 1993 as the fifth president of Singapore. He decided not to run for a second term as president in 1999 partially due to the death of his wife.

Ong died in his sleep from lymphoma at the Singapore General Hospital on 8 February 2002, at the age of 66.

Early life and education

Born to Ong Keng Wee and Chung Lai Heng on 22 January 1936 in Singapore, Ong was the second of five children from a middle-class family. His English-educated father Ong Keng Wee, felt that the Chinese language was important if one ever want to become successful in business at the time and thus sent all of his children to Chinese-medium schools. 

Ong graduated with distinctions from The Chinese High School in 1955. Having received a Chinese-language education, Ong saw little opportunity for advancing his studies in the University of Malaya, as English was the university's language medium.

In 1956, with the help of his father's friends, Ong ventured abroad. Those years were to shape both his beliefs and passions. Ong studied architecture at the University of Adelaide along with his childhood sweetheart and future wife, Ling Siew May. Both Ong and Ling met each other during a Christmas party while they were still studying in secondary school.

In 1965, Ong received a Colombo Plan scholarship to pursue a master's degree in urban planning at the University of Liverpool and graduated in 1967.

Career
Upon graduation, Ong worked as an architect in Adelaide, Australia, and married Ling in 1963. Ong and his wife occasionally recite Chinese poetry and verses they learnt during their younger days.

In 1967, Ong joined the Ministry of National Development (MND) as a town planner. After four years of civil service, Ong resigned in 1971, and started his own architectural firm, Ong & Ong Architects & Town Planners, with his wife.

Political career
Ong's political career spanned 21 years. He was a Member of Parliament (MP), Cabinet minister and Deputy Prime Minister, before he resigned to become the first elected President of Singapore in 1993.

Ong's political beginnings started when he got involved in the grassroots activities in Seletar and was then introduced to Prime Minister Lee Kuan Yew. The People's Action Party (PAP) subsequently fielded him as a PAP candidate contesting in Kim Keat SMC during the 1972 general election. 

His first political appointment came just three years later when he was appointed Senior Minister of State for Communications. At that time, Ong pushed for the development of the Mass Rapid Transit (MRT), the largest construction project in Singapore's history. During his tenure as Minister for Communications, Ong was a proponent and advocate of the Mass Rapid Transit system. He was subsequently appointed Second Deputy Prime Minister in 1985.

Secretary-General of the NTUC

Replacing Lim Chee Onn
In 1983, Ong succeeded Lim Chee Onn as Secretary-General of the National Trades Union Congress (NTUC). Historically, the non-communist trade unions, led by the NTUC, have had a "uniquely cosy relationship" with the PAP government in "a tripartite system" and were key political allies to the PAP's securing of power in the 1960s. Though in 1982, Lim Chee Onn, still the secretary-general, had "proclaimed effusive[ly]" that the "PAP and the NTUC came from the same mother—the struggle with the communists and the colonialists," the relations between the unions and the government had become more strained by the 1980s.

Older grassroots union leaders had been excluded from decisions in the top NTUC leadership, which, by the analysis of Michael Barr, had come to be dominated by de facto appointed PAP technocrats foreign to the grassroots labour movement. Lee Kuan Yew felt that Lim, although his "protégé", was not "progressing well" in the "process of meshing in the [elite] scholars and the professionals with the rank-and-file union leaders" in NTUC, causing "increasing disquiet" among the grassroots union leaders. Lim himself had been preceded by Devan Nair, founder of the NTUC and a well-known democratic socialist member of the PAP's Old Guards, and Phey Yew Kok, a powerful union leader who was instrumental in convincing Chinese unions to join the NTUC during the 1970s, but had been forced to resign in 1980 and fled the country in a corruption scandal.

However, the leadership style of Lim and other newer top NTUC leaders had increasingly alienated elements of the union grassroots. The United Workers of Petroleum Industry (UWPI) and NTUC Triennal Delegates' Conference publicly opposed the government's attempts to make house unions the norm, to the political chagrin of Lee Kuan Yew.

In an open letter, Lee Kuan Yew informed Lim that he would leave the NTUC to "take charge of a Government ministry" and that "Ong Teng Cheong [will] take over from you as secretary general".

According to Barr, though the position of Secretary-General is "routinely occupied by members of Cabinet", Ong "stood out": Ong was Minister for Labor, Chairman of the PAP and "regarded as a potential successor to Lee Kuan Yew".

Implicit pact with unions
Ong made many grounds in repairing the strained relationship between the unions and the government where Lim had failed. After a few months as secretary-general, "he confronted the rebellious leadership of UWPI" where "they quickly reversed their opposition to house unions", and in 1985 the Triennial Delegates Conference endorsed the government's push for house unions. Barr writes, "Ong had a mastery of institutional power".

Although striking was prohibited and trade unions were barred from negotiating such matters as promotion, transfer, employment, dismissal, retrenchment, and reinstatement, issues that "accounted for most earlier labour disputes", the government generally provided measures for workers' safety and welfare since the 1960s and serious union disputes, with employers were almost always handled through the Industrial Arbitration Court, which had powers of both binding arbitration and voluntary mediation. However, the grassroots leaders in the unions had become increasingly worried about their marginalisation in Singapore politics. Peter Vincent, President of the NTUC from 1980 to 1984, stated that PAP technocrats should "remain in advisory positions [in the NTUC] until they have gained the respect of the union movement". In response, Ong "increased the levels of consultation with his colleagues in the NTUC" and "reversed the trend of excluding grassroots leaders from the upper reaches of the NTUC".

Ong was also a ferocious union activist, "working actively and forcefully in the interests of the unions in a way that Lim had never seen to do" and "stretch[ing] union activism to the very limits of that which would be tolerated by the government"; Barr argues that this activism would have been impossible to tolerate had anyone else less trusted than Ong had been charge of the NTUC. In the implicit pact, the unions would, in return, co-operate with the "government's core industrial relations strategies".

In January 1986, Ong sanctioned a strike in the shipping industry, the first for about a decade in Singapore, believing it was necessary as "[the] management were taking advantage of the workers". However, he did not inform the Cabinet beforehand out of fear that the Cabinet would prevent him from going ahead with the strike. Ong recalled in a 2000 interview in Asiaweek: "Some of them were angry with me about that... the Minister for Trade and Industry was very angry, his officers were upset. They had calls from America, asking what happened to Singapore?" Minister for Trade and Industry Tony Tan, vigorously opposed Ong Teng Cheong's decision to sanction the strike, being concerned with investors' reactions to a perceived deterioration of labour relations or an impact on foreign direct investment needed for jobs creation. Ong Teng Cheong viewed the strike as a success: "I had the job to do... [the strike] only lasted two days. All the issues were settled. It showed the management was just trying to pull a fast one."

According to Barr, Ong justified his commitment "in Confucian terms" in a "notion akin to noblesse oblige".

Demonstration at the United States Embassy
As Secretary-General of the NTUC, Ong also organised a 4,000-strong demonstration at the United States Embassy in protest against the United States First Secretary E. Mason Hendrickson's encouragement of dissident lawyers to stand for election against the PAP.

Presidency
Ong became Singapore's first elected president in 1993 and was ex officio appointed Chancellor of the National University of Singapore and the Nanyang Technological University. 

Ong's presidency was marked by many charitable projects—the largest of which is the President's Star Charity, an annual event initiated by Ong. It has benefited many charities, arts groups and youth organisations. Ong stepped down as president at the age of 63. 

Ong ran for the presidency under the PAP's endorsement. He ran against Chua Kim Yeow, former Accountant-General, for the office. A total of 1,756,517 votes were polled. Ong received 952,513 votes while Chua had 670,358 votes despite the former having a higher public exposure and a much more active campaign than Chua.

However, soon after his election to the presidency in 1993, Ong was tangled in a dispute over the access of information regarding Singapore's financial reserves. The government said it would take 56-man-years to produce a dollar-and-cents value of the immovable assets. Ong discussed this with the accountant-general and the auditor-general and eventually conceded that the government could easily declare all of its properties, a list that took a few months to produce. Even then, the list was not complete; it took the government a total of three years to produce the information that Ong requested.

In an interview with Asiaweek six months after stepping down from the presidency, Ong indicated that he had asked for the audit based on the principle that as an elected president, he was bound to protect the national reserves, and the only way of doing so would be to know what reserves—both liquid cash and assets—the government owned.

In the last year of his presidency, Ong found out, through the newspapers, that the government aimed to submit a bill to Parliament to sell the Post Office Savings Bank to The Development Bank of Singapore Limited. The POSB was a government statutory board whose reserves were under the president's protection; the move according to Ong, was procedurally inappropriate and did not regard Ong's significance as the guardian of the reserves; he had to call and inform the government of this oversight. Still, the sale proceeded, and The Development Bank of Singapore Limited still owns the Post Office Savings Bank.

Ong was appointed as Honorary Knight Grand Cross of the Order of St Michael and St George (GCMG) by Queen Elizabeth II of the United Kingdom in 1998.

Ong decided not to run for a second term as president in 1999 partially because of the death of his wife. He was succeeded by S. R. Nathan.

Death
Ong died in his sleep from lymphoma on 8 February 2002, at the age of 66,  at the Singapore General Hospital at about 8:15pm Singapore Standard Time (UTC+08:00) after he had been discharged from hospital a few days earlier. 

Prior to his death, Ong had asked to be cremated and for the ashes to be placed at Mandai Columbarium with those of ordinary citizens instead of Kranji State Cemetery, where late dignitaries are usually buried. Ong was given a state-assisted funeral. In a reply to Leong Sze Hian by the Prime Minister's Press Secretary, Chen Hwai Liang said that the decision to offer a state funeral lies with the prime minister and his Cabinet, after which they would take the family's wishes into consideration.

As a mark of respect, State flags at all Government buildings were flown at half-mast, including the Istana, on 11 February instead of on 12 February, the day of Ong's funeral, to avoid State flags at half-mast on the first day of the Chinese New Year.

Legacy
Ong was also known as "The People's President".

The Ong Teng Cheong Professorship in Music was launched by National University of Singapore on 2 October 2002.

The Ong Teng Cheong Student Activities and Leadership Training Centre was opened in his alma mater Hwa Chong Institution on 21 March 2007.

The Singapore Institute of Labour Studies, which opened in 1990, was renamed the Ong Teng Cheong Institute of Labour Studies in March 2002. It was later renamed as the Ong Teng Cheong Labour Leadership Institute.

In August 2017, a mountain range located in south eastern Kazakhstan near the Kyrgyz border, was named Ong Teng Cheong peak.

Notes

External links

 Ong Teng Cheong – In Memory of Singapore's first Elected President, Mr. Ong Teng Cheong (1936–2002)
 In Memoriam of Ong Teng Cheong  – ChannelNewsAsia

1936 births
2002 deaths
Alumni of the University of Liverpool
Deaths from cancer in Singapore
Deaths from lymphoma
Honorary Knights Grand Cross of the Order of St Michael and St George
Hwa Chong Institution alumni
Members of the Cabinet of Singapore
Members of the Parliament of Singapore
People's Action Party politicians
Singaporean politicians of Chinese descent
Presidents of Singapore
Singaporean agnostics
Singaporean architects
Singaporean art patrons
Singaporean people of Hokkien descent
University of Adelaide alumni
Singaporean trade unionists
Deputy Prime Ministers of Singapore
Communications ministers of Singapore
Ministers for Labour of Singapore